Vaugneray is a commune in the Rhône department in eastern France.

On 1 January 2015, Vaugneray annexed the neighboring commune of Saint-Laurent-de-Vaux. It is since 2014 twinned with the Romanian town of Dăbuleni.

Population
The population data given in the table below refer to the commune in its geography as of January 2020.

See also
Communes of the Rhône department

References

Communes of Rhône (department)
Rhône communes articles needing translation from French Wikipedia